Treadgold is a surname. Notable people with the surname include:

John Treadgold (1931–2015), British Anglican priest
Mary Treadgold (1910–2005), British author, literary editor, and television producer
Warren Treadgold (born 1949), American historian

See also
Tredgold